Cuddington is a village and civil parish within the Buckinghamshire district in the ceremonial county of Buckinghamshire, England. It is near the Oxfordshire border, about six miles west of Aylesbury.

The village name is Old English (Anglo-Saxon) in origin, and means "Cudda's estate." In the Domesday Book of 1086 it was recorded as Cudintuna. Anciently the village was the location of a medicinal spring of great repute, though its exact location is unknown.  The Church of St Nicholas dates from the 12th Century but was much restored in 1857.  Across the road is Tyringham Hall that dates from the 17th Century.  During the Second World War the King of Norway who was staying at the nearby Hartwell House attended a church service in the village.

Cuddington is centred on the village green and the road junction linking Aylesbury, Long Crendon and Haddenham.  The majority of the original houses were built on the north side but in the last 50 years or so new homes have been built predominantly on the south side.

The current population is around 550 residents. Two of the most famous former residents were Jonathan and David Dimbleby.

The village, like surrounding villages, has been the location of several Midsomer Murders episodes.

Facilities in the village include:
 Shop/post office
 Hairdressing salon
 Pub/Restaurant
 2 Churches (although one of these is rarely used)
 Village Hall
 Playing Field with Clubhouse, Tennis Courts, Children's Park and Cricket and Football pitches

For many years the village has won the regional heat of Britain's Best Kept Village Competition and also the Britain in Bloom competition.

Cuddington and Dinton Church of England School is a mixed Church of England primary school. It is a voluntary aided school, which takes children from the age of four through to the age of eleven. Cuddington was an infant school but has recently merged with Dinton School to form a full primary school on two sites. There are now just over one hundred pupils on roll.

Famous residents past and present
Richard Dimbleby - Broadcaster 
David Dimbleby – Broadcaster 
Jonathan Dimbleby – Broadcaster 
John Holyman – 16th century Bishop of Bristol
Labi Siffre - Singer/ songwriter 
 Terry Lloyd - ITN News Journalist
 Brendan Cole - dancer TV Entertainer

References

External links 

 Cuddington Village Website
 Cuddington and Dinton Church of England School
 Cuddington Kites Cricket Club

Villages in Buckinghamshire
Civil parishes in Buckinghamshire